Hard Corps may refer to: 
 Hard Corps (English band), 1980's English electronic band
 H.A.R.D. Corps, 1992–96 comic series
 Contra: Hard Corps, 1994 video game
 The Hard Corps, 2006 film
 Hard Corps: Uprising, 2011 video game

See also 
 Hardcore (disambiguation)